Sabine Schöffmann (born 28 July 1992) is an Austrian snowboarder specializing in parallel slalom and parallel giant slalom disciplines. She is a junior World champion in both parallel slalom and parallel giant slalom.

World Cup results
All results are sourced from the International Ski Federation (FIS).

Season standings

Race Podiums
 3 wins – (3 PSL)
 8 podiums – (6 PSL, 2 PGS)

Olympic results

World Championships results

References

External links

 

1992 births
Living people
Austrian female snowboarders
Competitors at the 2013 Winter Universiade
Competitors at the 2015 Winter Universiade
Universiade medalists in snowboarding
Universiade silver medalists for Austria